The 2006 Big South Conference baseball tournament  was the postseason baseball tournament for the Big South Conference, held from May 24 through 27 at Charles Watson Stadium, home field of Coastal Carolina in Conway, South Carolina.  The top six finishers participated in the double-elimination tournament. The champion, won the title for the first time, and earned an invitation to the 2006 NCAA Division I baseball tournament.

Format
The top six finishers from the regular season qualified for the tournament.  The teams were seeded one through six based on conference winning percentage and played a double-elimination tournament.

Bracket and results

All-Tournament Team

Most Valuable Player
Rob Vernon was named Tournament Most Valuable Player.  Vernon was an outfielder for UNC Asheville.

References

Tournament
Big South Conference Baseball Tournament
Big South baseball tournament
Big South Conference baseball tournament